Johann Heinrich Christian Schubart (28 February 1800, Marburg – 1 May 1885, Kassel) was a German classical philologist and librarian.

From 1816 to 1820 he studied ancient history at the University of Marburg, then continued his education at Heidelberg as a student of Friedrich Creuzer and Friedrich Christoph Schlosser. He obtained his doctorate in Marburg with the dissertation thesis De Hyperboreis, and for several years worked as a private tutor for various families of nobility in Württemberg and Austria.

In 1834 he was named secretary at the Landesbibliothek Kassel, where he later obtained the positions of second librarian (1850) and first librarian (1874). In 1834 he was co-founder of the Verein für hessische Geschichte und Landeskunde (Association for Hessian history and geography), of which he was also an editor of its journal.

Published works 
He is best remembered for his studies of Pausanias, and with Ernst Christian Walz, he published a three-volume edition on the ancient Greek geographer, titled Pausaniae Descriptio Graeciae (1838–39). Later on, he published a smaller version (2 volumes, 1854–55) and also an edition that was translated into German as Beschreibung von Griechenland (1857–63). 
 , (dissertation) 1825.
 , 1832.
 , (with Ernst Christian Walz) 3 volumes, 1838-39.
  (edition of Wigand Lauze; with Karl Bernhardi, 2 volumes in 5) 1841-47. 
 , 1855.
 , 1869 – a treatise involving Plato's Theatetus.

References

External links
 

1800 births
1885 deaths
University of Marburg alumni
Heidelberg University alumni
People from Marburg
German classical philologists
German librarians